Eriş is a Turkish name and may refer to:

Given name
 Eriş Özkan, Turkish footballer

Surname
 Ceyhun Eriş, Turkish footballer
 Murat Eriş, Turkish table tennis player

See also
 Eris (disambiguation)

Turkish-language surnames
Turkish masculine given names